Lex van Haeften (born 26 June 1987) is a Dutch professional footballer who plays as a goalkeeper.

External links
 Voetbal International

1987 births
Living people
Dutch footballers
Footballers from Gouda, South Holland
Excelsior Rotterdam players
Eredivisie players
Association football goalkeepers